Herochroma nigrescentipalpis is a moth of the family Geometridae first described by Louis Beethoven Prout in 1916. It is found on Sulawesi.

References

Moths described in 1916
Pseudoterpnini
Moths of Indonesia